Torstein Tvedt Solberg (born 2 March 1985) is a Norwegian politician for the Labour Party.

Education 

Solberg attended Stavanger Cathedral School. He obtained a bachelor's degree at University of Rogaland a master's degree in Culture, Environment and Sustainability at the University of Oslo in 2013.

Political career 

He was a member of Stavanger city council from 2003 to 2011. He was active in Rogaland Workers' Youth League (AUF) for several years and headed it in 2005. He worked as a secretary for Rogaland AUF from 2005 to 2006 and worked as international secretary of the national  from 2007 to 2009.

He served as a deputy representative to the Parliament of Norway from Rogaland during the term 2009–2013. He got the second spot on Rogaland Labour list for the 2013 Norwegian parliamentary election, considered to be a safe mandate for the Labour Party.

In September 2012, he was appointed political advisor to Minister of Trade and Industry Trond Giske.

References

1985 births
Living people
Deputy members of the Storting
Labour Party (Norway) politicians
Politicians from Stavanger
University of Oslo alumni
21st-century Norwegian politicians